Safdarjung's tomb is a sandstone and marble mausoleum in Delhi, India. It was built in 1754 in the late Mughal Empire style for Nawab Safdarjung. The monument has an ambience of spaciousness and an imposing presence with its domed and arched red, brown and white coloured structures. Safdarjung, Nawab of Oudh, was made prime minister of the Mughal Empire (Wazir ul-Mamlak-i-Hindustan) when Ahmed Shah Bahadur ascended the throne in 1748.

The tomb, within a garden, is in a late version of the style of earlier Mughal imperial tombs, most famously the Taj Mahal, with inside "eight paradises" (hasht bihisht) or eight rooms around the main chamber under the dome, and a garden divided into four parts outside.  This was the first time someone outside the immediate imperial Mughal family built themselves such a tomb and garden complex, reflecting the greatly diminished powers of the emperors by this date.

Geography
The tomb is located near the Safdarjung Airport at the T junction of Lodhi Road and Aurobindo Marg (earlier name Mehrauli Road) in New Delhi.

Background

The structure was constructed in 1754 in the late Mughal architecture style 

Safdarjung Mirza Muqim Abul Mansur Khan, who was popularly known as Safdarjung, who ruled over Awadh (Oudh) was an independent ruler of Awadh as viceroy of Muhammad Shah. He was very rich and powerful. With the death of Emperor Muhammad Shah of the Mughal Empire, he moved to Delhi. When Mohammed Shah Ahmed Shah ascended the throne of the Mughal Empire in Delhi in 1748, Safdarjung was made the Prime Minister (Vazir) of the empire with the title of Vazir ul-Mamalk-i-Hindustan and at that time the empire was on the decline as their rule extended only to North India. 

As Vazir he usurped all powers under his control as the king was only a puppet, a figurehead, who was into enjoying life with wine, opium, and women. But his control over the emperor's family was so cruel that the emperor called the Marathas to rid of their Vazir. The Marathas drove Safdarjung out of Delhi in 1753. He died soon thereafter in 1754. After his death, his son Nawab Shujaud Daula pleaded with the Mughal Emperor to permit him to erect a tomb for his father in Delhi. He then built the tomb, which was designed by an Abyssininan architect. It was built by Bilal Muhammad Khan, at the cost of three lacs of rupees.

To the south of this tomb is the historic site of the battle that was fought in 1386 between Timur of Mangol and Mohammed Tughlaq when the latter was defeated.

Architecture

The Safdarjung tomb, the last monumental tomb garden of the Mughals, was planned and built like an enclosed garden tomb in line with the style of the Humayun tomb. It was completed in 1754. The slabs from the tomb of Abdul Rahim Khankhana were used in the construction of the tomb.

The tomb has four key features which are: The Char Bagh plan with the mausoleum at the center, a ninefold floor plan, a five-part façade and a large podium with a hidden stairway.

The main entry gate to the tomb is two-storied and its façade has very elaborate ornamentation over plastered surfaces and is in ornate purple colour. There is an inscription in Arabic on the surface and its translation reads "When the hero of plain bravery departs from the transitory, may he become a resident of god’s paradise". The rear side of the façade, which is seen after entering through the gate, has many rooms and the library. To the right of the gate is the mosque which is a three-domed structure marked with stripes.

 
Entering through the main gate gives a perfect view of the mausoleum. Its walls are built high and the central dome, which is the main mausoleum of Safdarjung, is built over a terrace. Red and buff stones are the materials used for building the main mausoleum which measures  square. The central chamber, square in shape, has eight partitions with a cenotaph in the middle. Here there are partitions in rectangular shape and the corner partitions are in octagonal shape. The interior of the tomb is covered with rococo plaster with decorations. There are four towers around the main tomb at the corners which are polygonal in shape and are provided with kiosks. They have marble panels which are faded, and decorated arches. There is an underground chamber in the mausoleum which houses the graves of Safadrjung  and his wife. The ceiling of the mosque has been plastered, painted and ornamented.

The façade, though built in the style of the Taj Mahal, lacks symmetry as the vertical axis has been given prominence which has resulted in an unbalanced appearance to the tomb. The dome is more elongated; the central part has a taller pishtaq. The four minarets at the four corners are part of the main mausoleum which was totally a different concept in elevation compared to the Taj Mahal where the towers are detached and away from the facade of the tomb.

The architecture of the tomb is praised and also derided; it is derided for the lack of proportioning of its various units and use of poor material for construction. Reginald Heber, who was Bishop of Calcutta between 1823 and 1826, based on the light brown colour of the stone used, had observed that the tomb has the "colour of potted meat". Even ASI has observed that the marble used for ornamentation in the towers though pleasing is "rather florid". Another observation is that the tomb can not be compared to the Taj Mahal or the Humayun Tomb, as, at the time it was built, the Mughal Empire was on the decline and sandstone had to be used and lines were set improperly and the quality appeared "thread bare".

Garden
The layout is in the form of four squares with wide footpaths and water tanks, which have been further subdivided into smaller squares. The garden is in the Mughal charbagh garden style, and is a smaller version of the garden of the Humayun Tomb which is also built in Delhi. One channel leads to the entrance gate and the other leads to the three pavilions. The main podium over which the mausoleum is built measures  on each side. The high walls have been built in rubble stone masonry and have recessed arches in the interior. The towers or chatris are octagonal in shape. Its overall layout consists of four pavilions which have multiple chambers and the entrance gateway to the east is impressive. On the eastern side adjoining the gate are many apartments and a mosque, and a courtyard. The pavilions are laid out in the western, northern and southern directions and are named Jangli Mahal (palace in the forest), Moti Mahal (pearl palace) and Badshah Pasand (King's favorite) respectively. Nawab's family used to reside in these pavilions. Now the entire monument is under the control of Archaeological Survey of India (ASI) who have their offices in the pavilions and also a library over the main gate

Recent times
On 21 August 2012, the then Health Minister of India, Ghulam Nabi Azad offered Eid prayers in a mosque in the complex. However under the law of Archaeological Survey of India (ASI), "prayers at centrally protected monuments are not allowed unless the practice was prevalent at the time when it was notified as protected" and it is one of the 174 protected monument of ASI in Delhi. Earlier also, Indian vice president Hamid Ansari "planned to offer Eid prayers" at the tomb but was cancelled at the "eleventh hour".

The tomb has four fountains on each of the four sides. In December 2013, it was reported that a plan was going on for "activating the fountains" as officials believed that they "were in working condition". But "in recent excavation", ASI unearthed a drainage system adjacent to the fountain. The system would "help them restart these". Though there are four fountains, but according to ASI, only one, which is opposite to the main entrance would be made "functional".

In June 2014, the ASI shifted their office from the tomb to General Pool Offices near the Indian National Army Colony. In November of the same year new visitor boards were installed in the tomb to "promote the lesser known but striking monuments in the city [referring to Delhi]".

The 2013 Hollywood film, Jobs, was shot in the tomb.

See also
Lal Bangla in Delhi, another example of later Mughal architecture
Tomb of Asif Khan in Lahore

Gallery

References

Bibliography

External links

Religious buildings and structures completed in 1754
Medieval India
Mausoleums in Delhi
Mughal tombs
Mughal gardens in India
Persian gardens in India
1754 establishments in India
1754 establishments in the Mughal Empire
Tombs in Delhi
Monuments of National Importance in Delhi